Barbara Elizabeth Sargeant (née Evans; 28 January 1940 – 23 June 2021) was an Australian swimmer. She competed in the women's 200 metre breaststroke at the 1956 Summer Olympics.

Two years after 1956 Olympic Games, she won the silver medal in the  medley relay and finished fifth in the 200m breaststroke final at the 1958 British Empire and Commonwealth Games in Cardiff, Wales.
 
She married Graham Sargeant, who also had a swimming background and won an Australian junior surf belt championship. She had two children - former Hockeyroo Megan Oman (née Sargeant) and son Andrew.

References

External links
 

1940 births
2021 deaths
Olympic swimmers of Australia
Swimmers at the 1956 Summer Olympics
Place of birth missing
Commonwealth Games medallists in swimming
Commonwealth Games silver medallists for Australia
Swimmers at the 1958 British Empire and Commonwealth Games
Australian female breaststroke swimmers
20th-century Australian women
21st-century Australian women
Medallists at the 1958 British Empire and Commonwealth Games